Joanne Camilleri (born 1982) is a Maltese pianist and harpsichordist.

Music education 
Joanne's early music education completed in Malta through the Associated Board of the Royal Schools of Music. She was tutored by Vincent Borg and by Ingrid Calleja whilst complementary studies in theory and aural awareness were pursued with Prof. Dr. Dion Buhagiar, Davinia Galea, Yvette Galea and Anthony Spiteri.

As a result of a performance in the last grade exam (grade 8 ABRSM), Camilleri was recommended for an Associated Board of the Royal Schools of Music International Scholarship by the examiner. She was not able to take up the offer to audition for one of the music conservatoires in the UK because of her age.

She completed her first performance diploma (ATCL) from the Trinity College of Music at 15.

At 16, she completed her second performance diploma, this time following the ABRSM program, obtaining another high distinction grade in her performance and, as a result, was once again recommended for an international ABRSM scholarship by the examiner. At 18, she obtaining a place the Royal Northern College of Music in Manchester, England, on a four-year full international scholarship. To date, she has been the only pianist, and just one of two musicians to have been awarded such a scholarship.

Camilleri placed first in the Bice Mizzi Vassallo Music Competition which gave her the opportunity to attend the Lake District Summer Music Academy in the United Kingdom. At 17, she was the youngest pianist on the advanced solo course. Her seasonal participation at the Lake District Summer Music Academy, made possible through scholarships, gave Camilleri opportunities to work with international pianists including Arnaldo Cohen, Ben Frith, Klaus Hellwig, Renna Kellaway, Leon McCawley, Thomas Sauer and Barry Snyder, as well as members of internationally renowned chamber ensembles, namely the Chilingirian String Quartet, the Sorrel String Quartet, the Skampa Quartet, Trio Ondine and Gould Piano Trio. Over the years whilst participating in the Academy, Camilleri performed in several Young Artists Concerts in Ambleside, Windermere, Grasmere and Hawkshead. She was also invited to give a solo recital to the Lake District Summer Music patrons.

Between her first and second year of undergraduate studies at the Royal Northern College of Music, Camilleri also sat and obtained a Licentiate of the Royal Schools of Music (LRSM) in Performance, achieving a grade of Distinction.

In 2004, she obtained a First Class honors Bachelor of Music degree, with first class in her final recital.

This was followed by a master's degree in performance with a Distinction grade a year later. Afterwards she achieved a Postgraduate Performance Diploma with Distinction. Both postgraduate years were sponsored by the Janatha Stubbs Foundation.

Whilst at the Royal Northern College of Music, Camilleri was tutored by Carole Presland, and by Russian virtuoso Alexander Melnikov. In her final year, she was one of twelve students selected to take part in the Gold Medal Weekend, a showcase for the college's students, where she performed a solo recital.

During her student years, several international musicians were influential to Camilleri's musical development. She participated in masterclasses with musicians such as Marcel Baudet, Sergei Dorensky, Franco Fodera, Nelson Goerner, Ruth Harte, Daniel Hoexter, Stephen Hough, Jin Ju, Nina Kazimrova, Steven Osborne, Stephen Savage, Cynthia Turner and Akiko Wakabayashi; whilst chamber music masterclasses included Ian Brown, Yair Kless, the late Christopher Rowland, Jeremy Young, Marco Von Pagee, Jesper Svedberg of the Kungsbaka Piano Trio, and the Piano Duo Jennifer Micallef and Glen Inanga.

In 2007, when she returned to Malta, Camilleri read for a Doctorate in Performance at the University of Malta, where she was mentored by Mro Michael Laus.  She was the first pianist to be awarded a Doctorate of Music in Performance by the University of Malta.

Career 
As a student at the Royal Northern College of Music, Camilleri performed in venues around Manchester, St. Martin-in-the-Fields in London, the Isle of Man and Tunisia.

Following her third graduation at the Royal Northern College of Music, Camilleri performed extensively as a recitalist, concerto soloist, chamber musician and orchestral pianist both locally in Malta and Gozo, and around Europe, America and Asia. Her performances have taken her to Sweden, Switzerland, Wales, Ireland, the United Kingdom, Russia, the United States, and China.

She has performed at functions including the Palais de Nations in Geneva, President's Palace in Malta, at the German Ambassador's Residency and the American Ambassador's Residency, as well as other concerts organized under the auspices of the Ambassadors for Ireland, United Kingdom, Tunisia and China. Commemorative events have seen her perform alongside other prominent international musicians such as British pianist Ann Rachlin at the Manoel Theatre in a Mozart Night, alongside Russian pianist Vladimir Ovchinnikov in a millennium year concert of Twentieth Century Music and alongside London Symphony Orchestra leader Carmine Lauri in a concert to celebrate Malta's Independence Day in London.

As concerto soloist and orchestral pianist, she has performed with the Malta Philharmonic Orchestra, the Armenian State Symphony Orchestra and British Orchestras, collaborating with conductors such as Wayne Marshall, Lancelot Fuhry, Clark Rundell, Eric Hull, Philip Walsh, Karl Jenkins, Sergey Smbatyan, Brian Schembri and Michael Laus, amongst others.

As a chamber musician, she has worked with various partners and ensembles, including the Chamber Music International Festival (RNCM), the Malta International Arts Festival, the Three Palaces Festival and the Victoria International Arts Festival on several occasions. She also performed in various festivals whilst touring Sweden and the United Kingdom on several occasions, as former member of the Camilleri Trio, with whom she also premiered a number of works, including a score for a silent film by Yasujiro Ozu.

Baroque interest 
Camilleri has an interest in 17th and 18th-century repertoire, and plays the harpsichord and organ continuo with the Valletta International Baroque Ensemble (VIBE), with whom she regularly performs. In 2017, they were invited to tour Madrid, Paris and Berlin as ambassadors to mark Malta's E.U. Presidency.

She has collaborated with baroque music specialists such as harpsichordists James Johnstone and Nick Parle, and baroque violinist Catherine Martin, whilst playing with the Ensemble as well as during performances as part of the Valletta International Baroque Festival.

Her doctoral thesis focused on Johann Sebastian Bach's Aria with 30 Variations.

Camilleri has given a number of solo recitals dedicated to the repertoire of the baroque era and specifically of works by J. S. Bach. She has also released two solo CDs dedicated to Bach's works.

Teaching 
Whilst still in the UK, in 2006 she was a visiting piano tutor at Uppingham School in Rutland.  When she later set base in Malta, Camilleri joined the teaching staff at the Malta School of Music as a full time member, teaching both solo piano performance and also chamber music.

For several years, she was also invited to give masterclasses as part of the annual Victoria International Arts Festival in Gozo.

Discography 
 In Bach's Footsteps
 Bach's Goldberg Variations
 
 Trio for clarinet, cello and piano by Ed Hughes

Recording music for film 
 Silent Film directed by Yasujiro Ozu (2010)
 Storbju directed by Davide Ferrario (2020)

References

External links 
 
 

1982 births
Living people
Maltese pianists
Women harpsichordists
20th-century births
21st-century pianists
21st-century women pianists